Scribner may refer to:

Media
 Charles Scribner's Sons, also known as Scribner or Scribner's, New York City publisher
 Scribner's Magazine, pictorial published from 1887–1939 by Charles Scribner's Sons, then merged with the Commentator which continued until 1942
 Scribner’s Monthly, literary periodical published from 1870–1881, when it changed names to The Century Magazine, which continued until 1930, when it was merged with The Forum.
 Scribner's Bookstores, owned by Barnes & Noble

Places
 Scribner, Nebraska, city in Dodge County, Nebraska
 Scribner, California, former town in Humboldt County

People
 Arthur Hawley Scribner (1859–1932), president of Charles Scribner's Sons
 Belding Hibbard Scribner (1921–2003), one of the pioneers of kidney dialysis
 Charles Scribner, the name of several members of a New York publishing family associated with Charles Scribner's Sons
 Frank Lamson Scribner (1851–1938), American botanist, mycologist, a pioneer in plant pathology in the United States.
 James M. Scribner (1920–?) United States Navy
 John Blair Scribner (1850–1879), president of Charles Scribner's Sons
 Lucy Skidmore Scribner (1853–1931), founder of Skidmore College
 Rod Scribner (1910–1976), American animator
 Sam A. Scribner (1859–1941), American businessman
 Sheila Scribner, American singer/songwriter 
 Sylvia Scribner (1923–1991), American psychologist and educational researcher
 Troy Scribner, American baseball player
 Wiley Scribner (1840–1889), American politician
 William M. Scribner (1877–1936), American politician